The Truth About Hansel and Gretel is a book written by German caricaturist Hans Traxler, which was published in 1963. The book is a satire which purports to tell the story of how teacher Georg Ossegg uncovered archeological evidence of the "real" Hansel and Gretel in 1962.

Summary 
According to the book, Ossegg determined that the fairytale, Hansel and Gretel, was based on the story of a 17th-century baker named Hans Metzler and his sister Grete. Hans and Grete Metzler lived in a village in the Spessart Forest during the Thirty Years War, and killed an old woman named Katharina Schraderin in order to steal her recipe for Nürnberger Lebkuchen (gingerbread).

In reality, Ossegg did not exist and the details of the story were fabricated by Traxler. Vanessa Joosen has called the book a "fictive nonfictional text," which "carries the features of a nonfictional text but consciously misleads the reader."

In popular culture 
Despite its fictional nature, the hoax convinced many in Germany at the time, and continues to have some traction.

In 1987, a one-hour twenty-two minute movie, Ossegg oder Die Wahrheit über Hänsel und Gretel, loosely based on the novel, was released in Germany.

In the 1980s, in another area neighboring the Spessart Forest, German pharmacist Karlheinz Bartels published a joking theory that Snow White was based on a real person named Maria Sophia Margarethe Catharina, Baroness von und zu Erthal. The theory was primarily inspired by Traxler's book. 

In October 2021, Tim Harford released the episode The Truth About Hansel and Gretel in his podcast Cautionary Tales about Traxler's satire.

References

Sources

 https://www.deutschlandfunkkultur.de/die-angebliche-hexe-war-eine-baeckerin.950.de.html?dram:article_id=135436 (in German)
https://www.filmdienst.de/film/details/1211/ossegg-oder-die-wahrheit-uber-hansel-und-gretel (in German)

Hoaxes in Germany
German folklore
1963 books